José de Ledesma (1630–1670) was a Spanish painter of the Baroque period.

Ledesma, born in Burgos painted large devotional canvases. After initial training in his native city, he moved to Madrid and entered the school of Juan Carreño de Miranda.

References

1630 births
1670 deaths
People from Burgos
17th-century Spanish painters
Spanish male painters
Spanish Baroque painters